In probability theory, the Wick product is a particular way of defining an adjusted product of a set of random variables. In the lowest order product the adjustment corresponds to subtracting off the mean value, to leave a result whose mean is zero. For the higher order products the adjustment involves subtracting off lower order (ordinary) products of the random variables, in a symmetric way, again leaving a result whose mean is zero. The Wick product is a polynomial function of the random variables, their expected values, and expected values of their products.

The definition of the Wick product immediately leads to the Wick power of a single random variable and this allows analogues of other functions of random variables to be defined on the basis of replacing the ordinary powers in a power-series expansions by the Wick powers. The Wick powers of commonly-seen random variables can be expressed in terms of special functions such as Bernoulli polynomials or Hermite polynomials.

The Wick product is named after physicist Gian-Carlo Wick, cf. Wick's theorem.

Definition

Assume that X1, ..., Xk are random variables with finite moments. The Wick product

is a sort of product defined recursively as follows:

(i.e. the empty product—the product of no random variables at all—is 1). For k ≥ 1, we impose the requirement

where  means that Xi is absent, together with the constraint that the average is zero,

Examples

It follows that

Another notational convention

In the notation conventional among physicists, the Wick product is often denoted thus:

and the angle-bracket notation

is used to denote the expected value of the random variable X.

Wick powers

The nth Wick power of a random variable X is the Wick product

with n factors.

The sequence of polynomials Pn such that

form an Appell sequence, i.e. they satisfy the identity

for n = 0, 1, 2, ... and P0(x) is a nonzero constant.

For example, it can be shown that if X is uniformly distributed on the interval [0, 1], then

where Bn is the nth-degree Bernoulli polynomial. Similarly, if X is normally distributed with variance 1, then

where Hn is the nth Hermite polynomial.

Binomial theorem

Wick exponential

References
 Wick Product Springer Encyclopedia of Mathematics
 Florin Avram and Murad Taqqu, (1987) "Noncentral Limit Theorems and Appell Polynomials", Annals of Probability, volume 15, number 2, pages 767—775, 1987.
 Hida, T. and Ikeda, N. (1967) "Analysis on Hilbert space with reproducing kernel arising from multiple Wiener integral". Proc. Fifth Berkeley Sympos. Math. Statist. and Probability (Berkeley, Calif., 1965/66). Vol. II: Contributions to Probability Theory, Part 1 pp. 117–143 Univ. California Press
 Wick, G. C. (1950) "The evaluation of the collision matrix". Physical Rev. 80 (2), 268–272.

Algebra of random variables